Ruk may refer to:
RUK or ruk is the Thai word for love. nah ruk can roughly be translated as 'worth loving' or 'loveable'. It is used in much the same way we use 'lovely'. It is very affectionate and can be used to males or females and is also often used for children.
Reserve Officer School (Reserviupseerikoulu, RUK), in Finland
Rük, a village in Azerbaijan
An android that appeared in the Star Trek episode "What Are Little Girls Made Of?"
RUK or rUK, a term sometimes used in Scotland to refer to the 'rest of the UK' (see Countries of the United Kingdom)